Mari Johanna Lampinen (born 11 September 1971) is a Finnish biathlete. She competed at the 1992, 1994 and the 1998 Winter Olympics.

References

External links
 

1971 births
Living people
Biathletes at the 1992 Winter Olympics
Biathletes at the 1994 Winter Olympics
Biathletes at the 1998 Winter Olympics
Finnish female biathletes
Olympic biathletes of Finland
Sportspeople from Lahti
20th-century Finnish women
21st-century Finnish women